The Speaker of the Pyidaungsu Hluttaw is the presiding officer of the Assembly of the Union, the joint assembly of the bicameral legislature of Myanmar.

Election 
After the completion of an election cycle, the Pyithu Hluttaw and Amyotha Hluttaw will convene their first sessions, during which the speakers and deputy speakers of both Houses will be elected among the representatives of the respective assemblies.

Upon the election of the speakers and deputy speakers of the two Houses, under the Constitution of Myanmar, the speaker and deputy speaker of the Amyotha Hluttaw will automatically fill in the role of the speaker and deputy speaker of the Union Assembly for a term of no more than 30 months, or half the parliamentary term, following which the speaker and deputy speaker of the Pyithu Hluttaw will continue as speaker and deputy speaker of the Union Assembly for the remainder of the parliamentary term.

List of speakers of the Assembly of the Union

References 

Legislatures of Myanmar